Los Gauchos judíos (Jewish gauchos) is a 1975 Argentine film based on the novel Los Gauchos Judíos (The Jewish Gauchos of the Pampas in its English version) by journalist and writer Alberto Gerchunoff. The story centers on a large group of Jews who escaped from Imperial Russia to Argentina to start a new life near the eastern border of Entre Rios province at the beginning of the 19th century.

Cast
 Pepe Soriano
 Luisina Brando
 China Zorrilla
 Víctor Laplace
 María Rosa Gallo
 Ginamaría Hidalgo
 Raúl Lavié
 Osvaldo Terranova
 Dora Baret

See also 

 The Jewish Gauchos
 Jewish gauchos

References

External links

 

1975 films
Argentine musical comedy-drama films
1970s Spanish-language films
Jewish Argentine culture
Films about Jews and Judaism
Films about immigration to Argentina
Gaucho culture
Films based on Argentine novels
Russian-Jewish diaspora
1970s Argentine films